The 1985 Vanderbilt Commodores football team represented Vanderbilt University in the 1985 NCAA Division I-A football season. The Commodores were led by head coach George MacIntyre in his seventh season and finished the season with a record of three wins, seven losses and one tie (3–7–1 overall, 1-4-1 in the SEC).

Schedule

References

Vanderbilt
Vanderbilt Commodores football seasons
Vanderbilt Commodores football